Bürenkhaan  is a town in the Norovlin sum (district) of Khentii Province in eastern Mongolia.

Populated places in Mongolia